Parathranites is a genus of crabs. It contains the following species:
Parathranites granosus Crosnier, 2002
Parathranites hexagonus Rathbun, 1906
Parathranites intermedius Crosnier, 2002
Parathranites orientalis (Miers, 1886)
Parathranites parahexagonus Crosnier, 2002
Parathranites ponens Crosnier, 2002
Parathranites tuberogranosus Crosnier, 2002
Parathranites tuberosus Crosnier, 2002

References

Portunoidea
Taxa named by Edward J. Miers